HBcAg (core antigen) is a hepatitis B viral protein. It is an indicator of active viral replication; this means the person infected with Hepatitis B can likely transmit the virus on to another person (i.e. the person is infectious).

Structure and function
HBcAg is an antigen that can be found on the surface of the nucleocapsid core (the inner most layer of the hepatitis B virus). While both HBcAg and HBeAg are made from the same open reading frame, HBcAg is not secreted. HBcAg is considered "particulate" and it does not circulate in the blood but recent study show it can be detected in serum by Radioimmunoassay. However, it is readily detected in hepatocytes after biopsy. The presence of both HBcAg and HBeAg proteins together act as a marker of viral replication, and antibodies to these antigens are a marker of declining replication.

Interactions
Tapasin can interact with HBcAg18-27 and enhance cytotoxic T-lymphocyte response against HBV.

See also 
HBeAg
HBsAg

References

Viral structural proteins
Hepatitis B virus